The Mesa Range is a range of flat-topped mesas comprising the Sheehan, Pain, Tobin and Gair Mesas, situated at the head of the Rennick Glacier in Victoria Land, Antarctica. it was given this descriptive name by the northern party of the New Zealand Geological Survey Antarctic Expedition of 1962–63.

Features

 Biretta Peak
 Campbell Glacier
 Exposure Hill
 Gair Mesa
 Haban Spur
 Mericle Rock
 Mills Valley
 Monument Nunataks
 Mount Ballou
 Mount Fazio
 Mount Masley
 Pain Mesa
 Pinnacle Gap
 Scarab Peak
 Sheehan Mesa
 Siders Bluff
 Tobin Mesa
 Veto Gap
 Watchtower Hill

References

Mountain ranges of Victoria Land
Pennell Coast